Aphelia is a genus of plants in the Restionaceae family. The entire genus is endemic to Australia. APG III system classifies this genus in the Centrolepidaceae family.

Species
 Aphelia brizula F.Muell. - Western Australia
 Aphelia cyperoides  R.Br. - Western Australia
 Aphelia drummondii (Hieron.) Benth - Western Australia
 Aphelia gracilis Sond. - South Australia, Tasmania, Victoria
 Aphelia nutans Hook.f. ex Benth - Western Australia
 Aphelia pumilio  F.Muell. ex Sond. - South Australia, Tasmania, Victoria

References

Poales genera
Restionaceae
Endemic flora of Australia